, was the third son of King Muryeong of Baekje. Some scholars believe he may be the same person as Prince Junda.

In October, 504, king Muryeong of Baekje sent a diplomat named Managun with tribute to Emperor Buretsu of Japan. Buretsu was angry that Baekje had not sent an envoy in a long time and detained the envoy. So, in April, 505 Muryeong sent a new envoy with Maagun with tribute but this time sending a message to Buretsu: “Previously to submit tribute I dispatched Managun, who was of no relation to the royalty of Baekje. Therefore, I humbly send Saa, that he may serve in the court.” He eventually had a son, the monk named Kun. He was the ancestor of the Yamato no Kimi.

See also
 Muryeong of Baekje
 Tomb of King Muryeong
 Yamato clan
 Takano no Niigasa
 Koreans in Japan
 Baekje
 Monarchs of Korea

References

Baekje people
Baekje Buddhists